The 1994 New England Patriots season was the team's 35th season, and 25th in the National Football League (NFL). It was the first under owner Robert Kraft, who purchased the team after preventing previous owner James Orthwein from moving the Patriots to St. Louis. Kraft still owns the team today. The Patriots finished the season with a record of ten wins and six losses, and finished tied for first in the AFC's East division.

The Patriots began the 1994 season with a 3–6 record before winning their final seven games, finishing 10–6 and qualifying the playoffs (their first winning season in 6 years). The Patriots were just two seasons removed from a 2-win season, and made the playoffs for the first time since 1986 and only the seventh time in the team's history. The 1994 Patriots featured 15 members of the 1992 Patriots: Ray Agnew, Bruce Armstrong, Vincent Brown, Eugene Chung, Ben Coates, Todd Collins, Sam Gash, Tim Goad, Pat Harlow, Maurice Hurst, Dwayne Sabb, Rod Smith, Michael Timpson, Kevin Turner, and Scott Zolak.  
It was also their first winning season since 1988. The winning streak started with a 26–20 overtime win over the Minnesota Vikings.

Drew Bledsoe and offensive imbalance 
In just his second NFL season, Patriots quarterback Drew Bledsoe threw the ball more than any quarterback in history in 1994. He set NFL records for pass attempts in a season (691 – this record was later broken by Matthew Stafford in 2012), pass completions and attempts in a game (45-for-70 with no interceptions, Week Eleven vs. Minnesota in overtime), and most games in a season with 50+ attempts (five). Bledsoe also led the NFL in passing in 1994, with 4,555 yards, and was fourth in touchdowns (25). Bledsoe also led the league in interceptions (27) and his passer rating was tied for 19th in the league, at 73.6. New England's 699 team pass attempts in 1994 is the third-most in NFL history, and the most ever for a team with a winning record.

In an odd statistical quirk, the Patriots' running game was one of the most inefficient in modern football. Their rushing game only gained 2.79 yards per attempt, the worst of any NFL team since the merger. (The average ground gain in 1994 was 3.7 yards per carry.) New England's 1,332 yards were dead-last in the AFC, and the second-fewest in the NFL to Atlanta.

Ownership changes 
The team's 35th season in football, 1994 marked the debut of Robert Kraft as team owner. A long-time season-ticket holder, Kraft has steadily built up a business empire to where in the late 1980s he was able to purchase the land around Sullivan Stadium and then the stadium itself – which he renamed "Foxboro Stadium" – and thus got control of the lease the team held with the stadium. This gave him a level of control over the team that new owners Victor Kiam and James Orthwein underestimated, so much that in January 1994, Orthwein sold his share of the team to Kraft, for nearly $200 million.

The selling of the team to Kraft led to an explosion of ticket sales, to where all home games were sold out well before the season began.

As part of the NFL's 75th anniversary celebration the Patriots wore throwback uniforms in games against the Cincinnati Bengals, Green Bay Packers, and New York Jets; the uniforms dated to the team's AFL days and marked the return of the Pat Patriot logo in the second season the team sported the more streamlined "Flying Elvis" look.

1994 NFL Draft

Personnel

Staff

Roster

Schedule

Playoffs

Standings

Game Summaries 
 September 4 at Miami Dolphins:
The debut game of Robert Kraft as team owner. Drew Bledsoe and Dan Marino put on a passing clinic, combining for 894 passing yards and nine touchdowns (two caught by Ben Coates of the Patriots and three snared by Irving Fryar of the Dolphins). The game was Marino's first game back from a ruptured Achilles tendon. The Dolphins won 39–35 after the Patriots drive stalled at midfield in the final minute. On the Patriots‘ previous drive Ben Coates fumbled the ball after a big gain and the Dolphins recovered.

 September 11 vs. Buffalo Bills:
The debut home game under Kraft's ownership, the Patriots rallied from down 35–21 in the fourth quarter as a Michael Timpson touchdown catch and Marion Butts rushing score tied the game, but Steve Christie's 32-yard field goal won the game for Buffalo 38–35.

 September 18 at Cincinnati Bengals:
The Patriots debuted their throwback uniforms and helmets, returning the Pat Patriot logo after it was retired following the 1992 season. David Klingler of the Bengals threw two touchdowns to Carl Pickens and Steve Broussard ran in two scores for the Bengals, but Klingler was sacked seven times and the Patriots behind Drew Bledsoe's 365 passing yards to Michael Timpson (125 yards with a 34-yard touchdown catch) and Ben Coates, two Marion Butts touchdown runs, and four Matt Bahr field goals overcame the Bengals for a 31–28 win, the Patriots' first under Robert Kraft ownership.

 September 25 at Detroit Lions:
The Patriots raced to a 20–7 lead and withstood a late Lions rally to win 23–17. Barry Sanders put on an impressive performance in the loss, rushing for 131 yards (outperforming the entire Patriots offensive backfield's 108 combined yards); NFL Films caught in slow motion a twisting Sanders run in which he shook off Patriots defenders Myron Guyton and Harlon Barnett for one of his two touchdowns; the image is among the most replayed in retrospectives on Sanders' career.

 October 2 vs. Green Bay Packers:
Both teams sported throwback uniforms, with the Packers in yellow and brown and the Patriots wearing the white road version of their AFL-era uniforms with Pat Patriot logo. The Packers stormed to a 10–0 halftime lead but two Vincent Brisby touchdown catches and a last-minute Matt Bahr field goal rallied the Patriots to a 17–16 win.

 October 9 vs. Los Angeles Raiders:
Drew Bledsoe threw two touchdowns in the second quarter for a 17–7 Patriots lead but the Raiders rallied behind three Bledsoe INTs (the first run back for a score by Terry McDaniel) and two Jeff Hostetler touchdowns (one on the ground) to win 21–17. Kevin Turner was drilled in mid-air diving for the goalline late in the fourth quarter; though it appeared he'd broken the goalline plane the ball was knocked out of his hands and recovered by the Raiders.

 October 16 @ New York Jets:
Two Brad Baxter touchdowns and a score from Boomer Esiason put the Jets up 21-7 at the half. Former Jet Blair Thomas scored in the fourth but the Patriots could not get closer than a 24-17 loss.

 October 23 BYE WEEK
 October 30 vs. Miami Dolphins:
Despite two interceptions Dan Marino had more passing yards (198) than the Patriots had yards of offense (188). Drew Bledsoe had a terrible day with three interceptions and just 125 yards; backup Scott Zolak finished the game with 28 passing yards.

 November 6 @ Cleveland Browns:
In what turned out to be a playoff preview, Bill Parcells faced his former defensive assistant Bill Belichick and the 6–2 Browns. Belichick's defense harassed Drew Bledsoe all game, forcing four interceptions and limiting the Patriots to just two Matt Bahr field goals while Leroy Hoard rushed for 123 yards and caught a one-yard Mark Rypien touchdown pass. The 13–6 loss dropped the Patriots to 3–6.

 November 13 vs. Minnesota Vikings:
Former Oilers quarterback Warren Moon led the Vikings to a 20–3 halftime lead, but in the third Bill Parcells abandoned his gameplan and went to a no-huddle attack. Drew Bledsoe threw touchdowns to Ray Crittenden and Leroy Thompson, the Patriots defense shut down the Vikings (the key play came with 2:04 to go in the fourth when Maurice Hurst swatted away a pass for Qadry Ismail). On the final drive Bledsoe was blitzed three straight downs but facing 4th and 10 from his 35 completed a 27-yard strike to Vincent Brisby, and Matt Bahr, after missing a field goal attempt late in the third quarter, kicked the tying field goal with 14 seconds left in regulation. On the coin toss for overtime Patriots captain Vincent Brown protested the Vikings team captain's call because he called after the coin landed on the ground. The Patriots won the re-toss and Bledsoe led the Patriots down field and lobbed a 14-yard touchdown toss to Kevin Turner. The 26–20 win ended a four-game losing streak. Moon threw for 349 yards while Bledsoe (426 yards) set NFL single-game records with 70 throws and 45 completions.

 November 20 vs. San Diego Chargers:
The rejuvenated Patriots raced to a 13–3 second-quarter lead as Leroy Thompson caught a 27-yard touchdown from Drew Bledsoe in the first quarter to go with two Matt Bahr field goals, but the Chargers scored after Bahr's second field goal as Andre Coleman ran back the ensuing kick 80 yards for a touchdown. The Patriots finally put the game away in the fourth on a one-yard Marion Butts score and another Bahr field goal, offsetting a Tony Martin touchdown catch from Stan Humphries.

 November 27 at Indianapolis Colts:
The Colts, clawing to a .500 season, hosted the Patriots on Sunday Night and limited New England to four Matt Bahr field goals, but despite 186 yards and a touchdown by Don Majkowski to go with 132 rushing yards by Majkowski, Marshall Faulk, and Roosevelt Potts, the Colts fell 12-10 as the Patriots recovered two Indianapolis fumbles.

 December 4 vs. New York Jets:
One week after the epic "Fake Spike" meltdown against the Miami Dolphins the Jets' season-ending losing streak continued while the Patriots ended a three-game losing streak to the Jets with a 24–13 win in Foxboro Stadium. The Jets led 13–10 in the third quarter but the Patriots pinned Boomer Esiason at his own goalline, then Ricky Reynolds ran back an interception for a touchdown. A Leroy Thompson touchdown in the fourth quarter finished off the Jets as Esiason ended with just 16 completions for 40 throws. The loss was Jets coach Pete Carroll's last trip to Foxboro until he became Patriots head coach in 1997.

 December 11 vs. Indianapolis Colts:
The Colts raced to a 10-0 lead as Drew Bledsoe was intercepted at the Indianapolis 10 and Ray Buchanan ran back a 90-yard touchdown, but from there Don Majkowski was intercepted twice, Bledsoe (despite four interceptions) tossed touchdowns to Leroy Thompson and Ben Coates, Thompson and Marion Butts scored on the ground, and the Patriots grabbed two more fumbles for a 28-13 win. The Patriots were now 8-6 and still in the hunt for a playoff spot while the Colts fell to 6-8.

 December 18 at Buffalo Bills:
The Patriots fell behind 17–3 in the second quarter, then scored 38 unanswered points for a 41–17 rout. The win knocked the Bills out of the playoffs after four straight Super Bowl trips.

 December 24 at Chicago Bears:
Needing a win to make the playoffs, the Patriots overtook the Bears 13–3, for their seventh consecutive win and ending their regular season at 10–6. It was their first playoff appearance since 1986 and first double-digit win season since that year as well.

 AFC Wildcard Playoffs, January 1 at Cleveland Browns:
After seven dramatic victories in a row, the Patriots fell flat in a 20–13 loss in their first playoff game since 1986. Drew Bledsoe was picked off three times despite a game-tying rally in the second quarter; he threw the ball 50 times but completed just 22 passes. Leroy Hoard and Earnest Byner totaled 96 rushing yards, outrushing the entire Patriots offensive backfield (57 yards). The win was the first in a playoff game for Browns head coach Bill Belichick. The Patriots successfully executed an onsides kick in this game; they would not succeed with an onsides kick until 2013, coincidentally against the Browns

See also 
 New England Patriots seasons

References 

New England Patriots
New England Patriots seasons
New England Patriots
Sports competitions in Foxborough, Massachusetts